HNK O’Connor Knights FC (also known simply as O'Connor Knights) is an Australian semi-professional soccer club based in the northern Canberra suburb of O'Connor, Australian Capital Territory. Founded in 1997 by North Canberra’s Croatian community, the club currently competes in the  National Premier Leagues Capital Football ACT. The Knights have won one Federation Cup and secured two ACT second division titles.

History

Founded in 1997 by Canberra’s Croatian community in North Canberra, O’Connor Knights is the second soccer club in Canberra with Croatian heritage (alongside Canberra Croatia FC in Deakin). O’Connor Knights previously competed at the top level of ACT soccer between the years of 2004 and 2009 but has spent the majority of its existence in the second division of ACT football.

O’Connor Knights has regularly competed in Croatian Cup (Australia & New Zealand), one of the oldest ethnic soccer tournaments in Australia, founded in 1974. The Knights won the national tournament, which was being hosted by Canberra Deakin, in 2004.

Premier League era

O’Connor Knights were promoted to the ACT Premier League (division one) for 2004 following the conclusion of the 2003 season. The Knights finished premiers of State League One (division two), beating former NSL club Canberra City to top spot by six points. UCU Pumas finished last in the Premier League in 2003 and were relegated to State League One.

O'Connor finished sixth in the Premier League in its first season in the top flight, missing out on the finals series by five points. The Knights performed better the next season in 2005 when the team finished second in the Premier League, behind Canberra Deakin, and qualified for finals. O'Connor won the major semi-final against Canberra Deakin 2-2 (7-5) on penalties. The two sides met again in the grand final, at Hawker Enclosed, where a fifteen minute goal to D.Camara secured the championship for Canberra Deakin over O'Connor.

The Knights next qualified for finals in 2007 after the club finished fourth in the league. Saturday 8 September 2007, The Knights faced-off against Canberra Olympic at the Belconnen Soccer Centre (now McKellar Park) in the minor semi-final but lost the match 1-4.

O’Connor Knights backed up the performances of 2007 in 2008 and again finished fourth in the league and qualified for the finals championship. The Knights were defeated in the minor semi-final by Belconnen United 0-3, ending their season.

2009 was the last season O'Connor Knights competed in the top division of ACT soccer , bringing an end to a six year spell in the top flight that started with promotion in 2004. The club finished the season mid-table in sixth place behind Tuggeranong United in fifth and ahead of ANU FC in seventh, missing out on finals in the process.

Return to Second Division

Despite relegation no longer being a mechanism between the Premier League and State League One in 2010, the O’Connor Knights registered for the State League One in 2010 rather than retain their position in the ACT Premier League. The Knights finished its first season back in State League One in fourth position in the table and qualified for the finals series, but were defeated in the semi-finals to league premiers White Eagles 3-4 despite a second half comeback.

In 2011, the Knights had a strong regular season, finishing second behind White Eagles and again qualifying for the finals series. On 27 August 2011, O’Connor were defeated in the semi-finals by the same opposition as the previous season (White Eagles) in what proved to be a high scoring affair (2-5) at ANU Willows 1. Despite the loss O’Connor advanced to the preliminary final at Kaleen Enclosed on 3 September 2011. There the Knights were again defeated, this time to ANU FC 0-1.

In 2013, O’Connor Knights were a founding club of the newly renamed and formed Capital League, which Capital Football established to replace the old State League One as the ACT’s recognised second division behind the new nationally linked top division, National Premier Leagues Capital Football (NPL Capital Football).

2017, O’Connor Knights finished runner-up in the Capital League for the first time. Five points behind Premiers ANU FC and four points ahead of Weston Molonglo FC in third. O’Connor then defeated ANU in the semi-finals 2-1 thanks to a second half brace of goals to Danny Krajacic to progress to the grand final directly. The Knights faced ANU, who beat Weston Creek in the preliminary final, in the grand final on 3 September 2017 at Woden Park. The two teams finished the first half locked at 1-1 but a second half saw a score blowout to ANU and the university team claimed a 5-1 victory over the Knights by the end of the match.

Club identity

Colours and crest

HNK O’Connor Knights draw its colour scheme (red, white and blue) inspiration from its Croatian heritage. The red and white checked (chequy) shield represents the Coat of arms of Croatia. The HNK stands for the Croatian term ‘Hrvatski Nogometni Klub’ which means ‘Croatian Football Club’. The name Knights refers to the importance of knights in Croatian history which is symbolised by the Knight helmet at the heart of the crest and the date of 1997 showcases the year the club was founded.

Home ground and facilities

Traditionally the Knights have been based out of O’Connor Enclosed but in recent years the Capital League team has been based in the Belconnen suburb of Hawker at the Hawker Football Centre. Hawker Enclosed underwent a large redevelopment in 2009 and was officially re-opened by then ACT Minister of Sport, Andrew Barr, as Hawker Football Centre. The capacity has been increased to around 3,000 people and the all-weather synthetic pitch (Tiger Turf) provides a consistent playing surface and drought proofs the venue.

Current squad

Honours

ACT NPL League Premiers and Finals Champions
Premiers (0):
Runner-up (1): 2005
Champions (0):
Runner-up (1): 2005

ACT NPL 2 Premiers and Finals Champions
Premiers (2): 1999, 2003, 2021
Runner-up (3): 2011, 2017, 2019
Champions (0):
Runner-up (4): 1999, 2003, 2017, 2019

Capital Football Federation Cup
Winners (1): 2008

Croatian Cup (Australia & New Zealand)
Champions (1): 2004

Capital Football Community League 3
Premiers (1): 2021

Season-by-season results

The below table is updated with the statistics and final results for O’Connor Knights FC following the conclusion of each ACT Capital League season (2013–18) and NPL ACT 2 season (2019–Present).

See also

List of Croatian football clubs in Australia
Australian-Croatian Soccer Tournament
Croatian Australian

References

External links
 Official website
 Official O’Connor Knights Supporters Page
 Capital Football home

Croatian sports clubs in Australia
Soccer clubs in Canberra
Association football clubs established in 1997
1997 establishments in Australia